Ricky Martin Live was the ninth concert tour by Puerto Rican singer Ricky Martin. It supported his compilation album, Greatest Hits: Souvenir Edition. The tour started in Newcastle on October 3, 2013 and continued across Australia for three weeks before coming to a close on October 20, 2013 in Melbourne.  
He continued throwing concerts in venues in the Americas in the later months, as well as participating in the Mawazine Festival in Rabat, Morocco.

Background and development
Between April and June 2013, Martin was one of the coaches on the second season of The Voice in Australia. In late May 2013, it was announced that he will tour Australia in October 2013, for the first time in over ten years. Martin will promote his already Gold-certified Greatest Hits: Souvenir Edition compilation and his new top-ten single "Come with Me". After originally announcing five concerts, four more dates were added later, including second concerts in Sydney Super Dome and Rod Laver Arena.

Critical response
The Australian leg has received positive reviews from music critics. Helen Gregory from The Newcastle Herald wrote that Martin has delivered one of Newcastle’s biggest shows of the year, fulfilling his promise to have the audience "sweating, dancing and shaking their bon bons in a night of intense adrenalin." This was Martin at his best; "energetic, engaging, charming and still at the helm of a powerhouse voice, even when swivelling his hips and samba dancing his way through a 95 minute set." The show was a great production, complete with lights, video, ten full or partial costume changes, eight dancers and a band composed of musicians from all over the world. Reviews by Take 40 Australia, Ninemsn and Glam Adelaide were also enthusiastic.

Opening act
Timomatic (select dates)
DJ Kid Massive (Sydney–October 18)

Setlist
The following setlist was performed at the Allphones Arena, in Sydney, Australia on October 18, 2013. It does not represent all concerts during the tour.
"Instrumental Introduction" 
"Come with Me"
"Shake Your Bon-Bon"
"It's Alright"
"Vuelve"
"Video Sequence"
"Livin' la Vida Loca"
"She Bangs"
"Loaded"
"Video Sequence"
"She's All I Ever Had" (performed with Luke Kennedy)
"Come to Me" / "Private Emotion" (performed with Kennedy and Ms Murphy)
"Nobody Wants to Be Lonely" (performed with Kennedy and Murphy)
"Video Sequence"
"Más"
"La Bomba"
"Lola, Lola"
"Pégate" (contains excerpts from Por Arriba, Por Abajo)
"María"
Encore
"Video Sequence"
"The Cup of Life"

Tour dates

Box office score data

External links
Ricky Martin official website

References

Ricky Martin concert tours
2013 concert tours
2013 in Australia